The 2021–22 Marquette Golden Eagles men's basketball team represented  Marquette University during the 2021–22 NCAA Division I men's basketball season. The team were led by first-year head coach Shaka Smart and played their home games at Fiserv Forum in Milwaukee, Wisconsin as a member of the Big East Conference. They finished the season 19–13, 11–8 in Big East play to finish a tie for fifth place. As the No. 5 seed, they lost in the quarterfinals of the Big East tournament to Creighton. They received an at-large bid to the NCAA tournament as the No. 9 seed in the East Region, where they lost in the First Round to North Carolina.

Previous season
The Golden Eagles finished the 2019–20 season 13–14, 8–11 in Big East play to finish in ninth place. They lost in the first round of the Big East tournament to Georgetown.

On March 19, 2021, the school fired head coach Steve Wojciechowski. A week later, the school named Texas head coach Shaka Smart the team's new head coach.

Offseason

Departures

Incoming Transfers

2021 recruiting class

2022 Recruiting class

Roster

Schedule and results

|-
!colspan=12 style=| Exhibition

|-
!colspan=12 style=| Non-conference regular season

|-
!colspan=12 style=| Big East regular season

|-
!colspan=12 style=| Big East tournament

|-
!colspan=9 style="|NCAA tournament

Source

Awards and honors

Big East Conference honors

All-Big East Awards
Most Improved Player: Justin Lewis

All-Big East First Team
Justin Lewis

All-Big East Honorable Mention
Darryl Morsell

Big East All-Freshman Team
Kam Jones

Sources

References

Marquette Golden Eagles men's basketball seasons
Marquette Golden Eagles
Marquette Golden Eagles men's basketball
Marquette Golden Eagles men's basketball
Marquette